The 1977 Monaco Grand Prix was a Formula One motor race held at Monaco on 22 May 1977. It was the sixth race of the 1977 World Championship of F1 Drivers and the 1977 International Cup for F1 Constructors.

The 76-lap race was won by South African driver Jody Scheckter, driving a Wolf-Ford. It was Scheckter's second victory of the season, and the 100th World Championship race victory for the Ford-backed Cosworth DFV engine. Austrian Niki Lauda finished second in a Ferrari, with Argentinian teammate Carlos Reutemann third.

Report
John Watson took his first career pole for Brabham with Jody Scheckter also on the front row and Carlos Reutemann third. It was Scheckter who got the best start to beat Watson to the first corner, with Reutemann running third in the early stages until he was passed by his teammate Niki Lauda. Watson ran second to Scheckter until mid-race when he had to retire with gearbox trouble, allowing Lauda to close in on Scheckter but the latter was flawless and held on to take his second win of the season. Lauda had to be satisfied with second, with Reutemann completing the podium.

Shadow driver Riccardo Patrese made his first career start in the race, qualifying 15th and finishing 9th.

Classification

Qualifying classification

Race classification

Championship standings after the race

Drivers' Championship standings

Constructors' Championship standings

References

Monaco Grand Prix
Monaco Grand Prix
Grand Prix